Trachypepla spartodeta is a moth of the family Oecophoridae first described by Edward Meyrick in 1883. It is endemic to New Zealand and has been collected in both the North and South Islands. This species inhabits native forest and adults are on the wing from November to January.

Taxonomy 
This species was first described by Edward Meyrick in 1883 using a specimen collected in Wellington in January. A fuller description of this species was given by Meyrick in 1884. George Hudson discussed and illustrated this species in his 1928 book The butterflies and moths of New Zealand. The female holotype, collected in the Wellington Botanic Garden, is held at the Natural History Museum, London.

Description

Meyrick described this species as follows:

This species is variable in the intensity and depth of its general colouration as well as in the markings on its forewings.

Distribution

This species is endemic to New Zealand and has been collected in Wellington as well as in Taupo, Dunedin and Southland. Hudson was of the opinion that this species was rather rare.

Habitat
This species inhabits native forest.

Behaviour
The adults of this species are on wing from November until January.

References 

Moths described in 1883
Oecophoridae
Taxa named by Edward Meyrick
Moths of New Zealand
Endemic fauna of New Zealand
Endemic moths of New Zealand